Domenty Sardionovich Kulumbegov (tr. ; , born 4 January 1956) was the Prime Minister of South Ossetia from January 20, 2014 to May 20, 2017. He was acting in that capacity until 2 April 2014.

Kulumbegov was born in Thinala in Gori district in the Georgian SSR.

References

1956 births
Living people
Prime Ministers of South Ossetia